Marián Varga (29 January 1947 – 9 August 2017) was a Slovak musician, composer and organist.

Biography
He played the piano from the age of six. He studied piano and composition at the conservatory in Bratislava. He left the conservatory after three years to become a member of the group Prúdy, and contributed to the legendary album Zvoňte zvonky. He left Prúdy as suddenly as he had left conservatory only to establish the first Czechoslovak art rock band Collegium Musicum.

The repertoire of Collegium Musicum, comprising mostly instrumental pieces, included reinterpretations of the themes of classics such as Joseph Haydn, Béla Bartók and Igor Stravinsky, complemented by original compositions. Already at this stage his work bore signs of postmodernism (Eufónia of the album Konvergencie), which later became the basic principle of his work.

When Collegium Musicum disbanded in 1979, Varga started a solo career. Among other achievements, he became a pioneer of absolute improvisation (real-time composition) in Slovakia. In the meantime he continued to contribute to popular music. His ongoing collaboration with Pavol Hammel led to five successful albums and to the first rock musical in Slovakia.

Discography

with Prúdy 
1968: Zvoňte, zvonky

Collegium Musicum 
1970: "Hommage à J.S.Bach / Ulica plná plášťov do dažďa" (SP)
1971: Collegium Musicum
1971: Konvergencie
1973: Collegium Musicum Live
1975: Marián Varga & Collegium Musicum
1978: Continuo
1979: On a Ona
1981: Divergencie
1997: Collegium Musicum '97 (Live)

with Pavol Hammel 
1972: Zelená pošta
1976: Na II. programe sna (along with Radim Hladik)
1978: Cyrano z predmestia
1989: Všetko je inak
1993: Labutie piesne

with Vladimír Merta 
1992: Cestou k ... Stabil - Instabil

Solo albums 
1984: Stále tie dni
2003: Solo in Concert (Live)
2006: Marián Varga & Moyzesovo kvarteto

Anthology 
2006: Hommage à Marián Varga

Awards
 Hall of Fame ZAI Award – Grand Prix
 Aurel Award – Lifetime Achievement
 Pribina Cross – 2nd Class

See also
 The 100 Greatest Slovak Albums of All Time
2003: Zostane to medzi nami

References

External links 
www.marianvarga.sk

1947 births
2017 deaths
People from Skalica
Slovak musicians
Czechoslovak Big Beat groups and musicians
Recipients of the Pribina Cross